The Magnificent Gladiator is a 1964 Italian sword-and-sandal film written and directed by Alfonso Brescia.

Plot
Attalus (or anachronistically "Hercules" in the English version) is captured by Roman soldiers on the frontier during the reign of Gallienus (AD 253-268). Attalus is brought back to Rome and forced to fight in the arena as a gladiator, but once there, he becomes embroiled in a plot to overthrow the emperor.

Cast
Mark Forest as Attalus
Marilù Tolo as Velida
Paolo Gozlino as Zullo
Jolanda Modio as Clea
Franco Cobianchi as Gallienus
Oreste Lionello as Drusius
Nazzareno Zamperla as Horatius
Fedele Gentile as Arminius
Giulio Tomei
Renato Montalbano

Release
The Magnificent Gladiator was released in Italy on 31 December 1964.

See also
 List of historical drama films
 Gallienus usurpers

Notes

References

External links
 

1964 films
Peplum films
Films set in the 3rd century
Films set in ancient Rome
Films set in the Roman Empire
Films directed by Alfonso Brescia
Films about gladiatorial combat
Films scored by Marcello Giombini
Sword and sandal films
1960s Italian-language films
1960s Italian films